Norman E. Fenton (born 1956) is a British mathematician and computer scientist. He is the Professor of Risk Information Management in the School of Electronic Engineering and Computer Science at Queen Mary University of London. He is known for his work in software metrics and is the author of the textbook Software Metrics: A Rigorous Approach, as of 2014 in its third edition.

Education
Fenton received his bachelor's degree in mathematics from the London School of Economics in 1978. He earned his Master of Science in 1978 and Doctor of Philosophy in 1981 at the University of Sheffield. At Sheffield he was the second research student of Peter Vámos. His doctoral thesis was "Representations of Matroids".

Career
Fenton was a postdoctoral fellow in the mathematics department at  University College Dublin from 1981 to 1982 and the Mathematics Institute of the University of Oxford from 1982 to 1984. At the end of that period he changed fields and began publishing papers on structured programming with Robin W. Whitty and Agnes A. Kaposi. In 1984 he joined the department of Electrical and Electronic Engineering at South Bank Polytechnic in London where he headed the Centre for Software and Systems Engineering research group. He began to publish on software metrics as well as program structure.

In 1989 Fenton moved to City University as a reader in software reliability, and became a professor of Computing Science in 1992. 

In 1998, Fenton, along with Martin Neil and Ed Tranham, set up the company Agena Ltd in Cambridge. Fenton was CEO between 1998 and 2015 and remains a director. In 2000, Fenton joined Queen Mary University of London (School of Electronic Engineering and Computer Science) where he works as a part-time professor. He is director of the Risk and Information Management Research Group.

Selected publications
Textbooks

 
 
 

Articles

References

External links
 Faculty website
 

1956 births
Living people
British mathematicians
Academics of Queen Mary University of London
Alumni of the London School of Economics
Alumni of the University of Sheffield
People educated at Ilford County High School